Kebalpur is a village development committee in Dhading District in the Bagmati Zone of central Nepal. At the time of the 1991 Nepal census it had a population of 4674 and had 907 houses in it.

Media 
To Promote local culture Kebalpur has one FM radio station Krishi Radio - 105 MHz Which is a Community radio Station.

References

Populated places in Dhading District